South Haven may refer to:

 South Haven, Indiana, U.S.
 South Haven, Wabash County, Indiana, U.S.
 South Haven, Kansas, U.S.
 South Haven, Michigan, U.S.
 South Haven Charter Township, Michigan, U.S.
 South Haven, Minnesota, U.S.
 South Haven, New York, U.S.

See also 
 Haven (disambiguation)
 New Haven (disambiguation)
 North Haven (disambiguation)
 East Haven (disambiguation)
 West Haven (disambiguation)
 Southaven, Mississippi, U.S.